A vug, vugh, or vugg is a small- to medium-sized cavity inside rock. It may be formed through a variety of processes. Most commonly, cracks and fissures opened by tectonic activity (folding and faulting) are partially filled by quartz, calcite, and other secondary minerals. Open spaces within breccias formed by an ancient collapse are another important source of vugs.

Vugs may also form when mineral crystals or fossils inside a rock matrix are later removed through erosion or dissolution processes, leaving behind irregular voids. The inner surfaces of such vugs are often coated with a crystal druse. Fine crystals are often found in vugs where the open space allows the free development of external crystal form.

The term vug is not applied to veins and fissures that have become completely filled, but may be applied to any small cavities within such veins. Geodes are a common vug-formed rock, although that term is usually reserved for more rounded crystal-lined cavities in sedimentary rocks and ancient lavas.

The word vug was introduced to the English language by Cornish miners, from the days when Cornwall was a major supplier of tin.

Images

See also
 Amygdule
 Rock microstructure
 Vesicular texture

References

External links

Petrology
Geology terminology
Cornish words and phrases